is a Japanese volleyball player. He competed in the men's tournament at the 2008 Summer Olympics.

References

External links
 

1973 births
Living people
Japanese men's volleyball players
Olympic volleyball players of Japan
Volleyball players at the 2008 Summer Olympics
Sportspeople from Tochigi Prefecture
Volleyball players at the 2006 Asian Games
Asian Games competitors for Japan
20th-century Japanese people
21st-century Japanese people